Alexander Hay Ritchie (1822 – 1895) was a Scottish-born American artist and engraver. He was born in Glasgow, and studied under Sir William Allan before moving to New York City in 1841. He specialised in mezzotints.

External links

 
Alexander Hay Ritchie at the Bridgeman Art Library
Smithsonian Institution: engraving by Ritchie of the first reading of Lincoln's Emancipation Proclamation

1822 births
1895 deaths
American printmakers
British emigrants to the United States
Scottish artists